Young Park, or variations including Young's Park or Youngs Park, may refer to:

in Canada
Young's Point Provincial Park, in Alberta
Youngs Harbor Park in Keswick, Ontario

in the United States
Young's Park (Overland Park, Kansas)
Young Park (Las Cruces, New Mexico)
Lake Youngs Park, in Washington state